Rotich is a personal name of Kenyan origin that may refer to:

Abraham Kipchirchir Rotich (born 1993), Kenyan middle-distance runner 
Bartonjo Rotich (born 1938), Kenyan 400 metres hurdler and sprinter
Caroline Rotich (born 1984), Kenyan marathon and half marathon runner specialising in the half-marathon
David Kimutai Rotich (born 1969), Kenyan race walker
Elisha Rotich (born 1990), Kenyan long-distance runner who specializes in the marathon
Ferguson Cheruiyot Rotich (born 1989), Kenyan middle-distance runner
Henry Rotich (born c. 1969), Kenyan civil servant and economist
Juliana Rotich, Kenyan information technology professional
Laban Rotich (born 1969), Kenyan middle-distance runner and 1998 Commonwealth Games champion
Lucas Rotich born 1990), Kenyan long-distance track runner
Lydia Rotich (born 1988), Kenyan steeplechase runner
Michael Rotich (born 1978), Kenyan middle-distance runner
Michael Kosgei Rotich (born 1982), Kenyan road runner and 2003 Paris Marathon winner
Sammy Kibet Rotich (born 1980), Kenyan marathon runner

See also
 Kiprotich, related name meaning "son of Rotich"

Kalenjin names